Bear Peak is a mountain summit in the Front Range of the Rocky Mountains of North America.

Mountain
Bear Peak is generally considered to be at the southern end of Boulder's Flatirons range, rock formations on the westernmost part of the city. The hike to the top of Bear Peak is a popular activity. In addition to hiking, Bear Peak has at least three rock climbing formations directly adjacent — The Slab, The Goose, and Seal Rock. These formations have rock climbs ranging from 5.2 (easy) to 5.13 (quite difficult). On June 26, 2012, the Flagstaff Fire erupted and burned an upper section of Bear Peak. Some homes in south Boulder were evacuated but no structures were lost in the blaze. The Flagstaff Fire was part of a busy 2012 fire season for Colorado.

See also

List of Colorado mountain ranges
List of Colorado mountain summits
List of Colorado fourteeners
List of Colorado 4000 meter prominent summits
List of the most prominent summits of Colorado
List of Colorado county high points

References

External links

Mountains of Colorado
Mountains of Boulder County, Colorado
North American 2000 m summits